The Military ranks of Rwanda are the military insignia used by the Rwandan Defence Forces. Rwanda is a landlocked country, and does therefore not possess a navy.

Commissioned officer ranks
The rank insignia for commissioned officers.

Other ranks
The rank insignia for NCOs and enlisted personnel.

References

External links
 Uniforminsignia.org (Rwandan Army)
 Uniforminsignia.org (Rwandan Air Force)

Rwanda
Military of Rwanda